The diving competition at the 2005 World Aquatics Championships took place in Montreal, Quebec, Canada from July 17 to July 24.

Medal table

Medal winners

Men

Women

Notable events
 Alexandre Despatie (Canada) broke the 800-point barrier scoring 813.60 points in the men's 3-meter springboard event, winning gold, and the world record. He becomes the first diver to win gold in all three disciplines of diving (1 m, 3 m, 10 m), two of them in 2005, one in 2003. He held all men's three titles simultaneously for a short time, as he did not compete in the 10 m event in Montreal, due to injury suffered in training.
 Chelsea Davis (United States), 17, smacks her face against the end of the springboard, in a dive gone awry, landing hard in the water. She leaves the blood-filled water conscious but with blood pouring from her nose, after failing in an inward 2½ somersault on the women's 3 m springboard, during the morning preliminary round. She was found to have no major injuries, just requiring 3 stitches.

References

External links
Full results from OmegaTiming.com

2005 World Aquatics Championships
Diving at the World Aquatics Championships
2005 in diving